The 2018 Guinée Coupe Nationale is the 59th edition of the Guinée Coupe Nationale, the knockout football competition of Guinea.

Round 1
Horoya AC and Hafia FC bye.

Groupe 1

[Jun 17]

Gbassikolo FC		0-2 Espérance de Coléah

[Jun 18]

FC Séquence	    	0-0 CO Coyah			[3-4 pen]

[Jun 19]

Étoile de Guinée FC 	3-4 AS Kaloum

TED Afrique	    	4-3 Atlético de Coléah

[Jun 20]

Santoba FC		1-2 AS Batè Nafadji

[Jun 21]

Flamme Olympique	bt  Satellite FC

Groupe 2

[Jun 17]

ASFAG			2-0 Gangan FC

Bafila FC		2-2 Soumba FC			[4-3 pen]

Soya Stars de Pita	0-1 Wawa AC de Kindia

[Jun 18]

Lélou FC		3-2 Fello Star

[Jun 21]

Olympique de Conakry	1-1 Loubha FC			[5-4 pen]

Alu Star de Fria	bt  Espoirs de Labé

Groupe 3

[Jun 17]

Éléphants de Filima	awd AS Mineur de Sangarédi	[3-0 awarded; AS Sangarédi withdrew]

CI Kamsar		1-3 Wakirya AC

[Jun 19]

RCC Kamsar		2-1 Eléphant de Coléah

[Jun 20]

AS Ratoma		0-2 Renaissance FC

Groupe 4

[Jun 17]

Niandan FC		1-2 Milo FC

Simandou FC (Beyla)	awd Sankaran FC			[3-0 awarded; Sankaran dns]

Yomou FC		awd AS Manding de Siguiri	[0-3 awarded; Yomou FC dns]

[Jun 18]

UNI Club de Kankan	0-0 Ashanti GB de Siguiri	[5-4 pen]

Round 2
Groupe 1

[Jun 25]

AS Kaloum		n/p TED Afrique			[rained off]

[Jun 26]

AS Kaloum		2-0 TED Afrique

Groupe 2

[Jun 25]

Wawa AC de Kindia	2-2 Bafila FC			[2-3 pen]

[Jun 27]

Olympique de Conakry	1-0 Lélou FC

Groupe 3

[Jun 27]

Wakirya AC		n/p Renaissance FC		[rained off]

[Jun 28]

Wakirya AC		1-0 Renaissance FC

Round of 16
Poule A

[Jul 7]

Olympique de Conakry	2-2 AS Batè Nafadji		[4-5 pen]

[Jul 8]

Éléphants de Filima	0-1 Wakirya AC

Milo FC			2-0 Simandou FC (Beyla)

Hafia FC		2-1 Flamme Olympique

Poule B

[Jul 7]

Horoya AC		5-1 Alu Star de Fria

RCC Kamsar		2-1 Club Olympique de Coyah

[Jul 8]

AS Manding de Siguiri	0-0 AS Kaloum			[7-6 pen]

Bafila FC (Forecariah)	0-1 ASFAG

Quarterfinals
Poule A

[Aug 9]

Hafia FC		0-1 Wakirya AC

[Aug 10]

Milo FC			3-0 AS Batè Nafadji

Poule B

[Aug 8]

ASFAG			0-0 Horoya AC			[3-4 pen]

[Aug 9]

RCC Kamsar		1-2 AS Manding de Siguiri

Semifinals
[Stade du 28 septembre, Conakry]

Poule A [Aug 20]

Wakirya AC		1-1 Milo FC			[4-3 pen]

Poule B [Sep 10]

Horoya AC		3-0 AS Manding de Siguiri

Final
[Oct 5, Stade du 28 septembre, Conacry]

Horoya AC		1-0 Wakirya AC

See also
2017–18 Guinée Championnat National

References

Guinea
Cup
Football competitions in Guinea